The Chacra Mesa is a high mesa massif composing the southwestern flank of Chaco Canyon, a region that is notable for its rich collection of Ancestral Puebloan archaeological sites.

It is located in the northwest portion of the U.S. state of New Mexico, in what is now Chaco Culture National Historical Park. The ruins of Tsin Kletzin, a Chacoan great house, sit on top of it.

References

Colorado Plateau
Chaco Canyon
Mesas of New Mexico
Chaco Culture National Historical Park